Bedri Böke (1920 – 12 September 1974) was a Turkish equestrian. He competed in the individual jumping and team jumping events at the 1956 Summer Olympics.

References

External links
 

1920 births
1974 deaths
Turkish male equestrians
Olympic equestrians of Turkey
Equestrians at the 1956 Summer Olympics
Sportspeople from Istanbul